Thomas Hutchinson (20 June 1872 – 1933) was a Scottish footballer who played as a centre-forward.

Biography 
Hutchinson was born in Glasgow. He turned professional with Darlington in August 1891 before moving on to Newcastle United in October 1893. He joined Nelson in January 1894 and in July of that year signed for West Bromwich Albion for a £50 fee. He made his Albion debut in September 1894 in an away match at Sheffield United. He played in the 1895 FA Cup Final, which Albion lost to local rivals Aston Villa.

In July 1896 he moved to Celtic where he played two league games but then moved to Abercorn.

In 1897 he moved to Stockport County on a free transfer, but retired in May 1897 due to injury. He recovered sufficiently to make a comeback with Ellesmere Port in 1899, finally retiring for good in 1904. He died in Cheshire in 1933.

References 

 

1872 births
1933 deaths
Footballers from Glasgow
Scottish footballers
Association football forwards
Darlington F.C. players
Newcastle United F.C. players
Nelson F.C. players
West Bromwich Albion F.C. players
Stockport County F.C. players
FA Cup Final players